Aegimius (Ancient Greek: Αἰγίμιος) was the Greek mythological ancestor of the Dorians, who is described as their king and lawgiver at the time when they were yet inhabiting the northern parts of Thessaly.

Mythology 
Aegimius asked Heracles for help in a war against the Lapiths and, in gratitude, offered him one-third of his kingdom. The Lapiths were conquered, but Heracles did not take for himself the territory promised to him by Aegimius, and left it in trust to the king, who was to preserve it for the sons of Heracles, the Heracleidae.

Aegimius had two sons, Dymas and Pamphylus, who migrated to the Peloponnese and were regarded as the ancestors of two branches of the Doric race, the Dymanes and the Pamphylians of Anatolia, while the third branch, the Hylleans, derived its name from Hyllas, the son of Heracles, who had been adopted by Aegimius.

There existed in antiquity an epic poem Aegimius of which a few fragments are extant, and which is sometimes ascribed to Hesiod and sometimes to Cercops of Miletus. The poem, printed among Hesiodic fragments, survives in fewer than a dozen quotations, and seems to have been in part concerned with the myth of Io and Argos Panoptes.

Notes

References 

 Athenaeus of Naucratis. The Deipnosophists or Banquet of the Learned. London. Henry G. Bohn, York Street, Covent Garden. 1854.  Online version at the Perseus Digital Library.
 Athenaeus of Naucratis. Deipnosophistae. Kaibel. In Aedibus B.G. Teubneri. Lipsiae. 1887. Greek text available at the Perseus Digital Library.
 Diodorus Siculus, The Library of History translated by Charles Henry Oldfather. Twelve volumes. Loeb Classical Library. Cambridge, Massachusetts: Harvard University Press; London: William Heinemann, Ltd. 1989. Vol. 3. Books 4.59–8. Online version at Bill Thayer's Web Site
 Diodorus Siculus, Bibliotheca Historica. Vol 1-2. Immanel Bekker. Ludwig Dindorf. Friedrich Vogel. in aedibus B. G. Teubneri. Leipzig. 1888–1890. Greek text available at the Perseus Digital Library.
 Pindar, Odes translated by Diane Arnson Svarlien. 1990. Online version at the Perseus Digital Library.
 Pindar, The Odes of Pindar including the Principal Fragments with an Introduction and an English Translation by Sir John Sandys, Litt.D., FBA. Cambridge, MA., Harvard University Press; London, William Heinemann Ltd. 1937. Greek text available at the Perseus Digital Library.
 Pseudo-Apollodorus, The Library with an English Translation by Sir James George Frazer, F.B.A., F.R.S. in 2 Volumes, Cambridge, MA, Harvard University Press; London, William Heinemann Ltd. 1921. . Online version at the Perseus Digital Library. Greek text available from the same website.
 Stephanus of Byzantium, Stephani Byzantii Ethnicorum quae supersunt, edited by August Meineike (1790-1870), published 1849. A few entries from this important ancient handbook of place names have been translated by Brady Kiesling. Online version at the Topos Text Project.

Ancient legislators
Mythological kings of Thessaly
Kings in Greek mythology

Mythology of Heracles
Dorian mythology